Brian Umony (born 12 December 1988 in Jinja, Uganda) is a Ugandan footballer who plays for Kampala City Council FC. Since 2009, he has also been a regular member of the Uganda national football team.

Early life
Born on 12 December 1988 in Jinja to Francis Kermit and Loise Uwanchango, Umony is the youngest of four children. After the death of his mother in 1997, he moved to Kampala to live with his maternal uncle. He started playing football at a young age but struggled to get onto the school teams as he was constantly overlooked because of his small stature.

Club career

2007-08
Umony signed with Kampala City Council FC (KCC) in 2007 after failing to achieve promotion with First Division side Naguru Avis. Coming on as a second-half substitute, he scored the winning goal on his league debut for KCC against Iganga TC. In his first season in the top-flight, Umony finished the league as joint top scorer with 15 goals to help KCC claim their first league title in 11 years. He also received the Footballer of the Year award for his goalscoring antics.

2008-09
In his second season with KCC, scored 19 goals in the Uganda Super League, three behind Police FC's Peter Ssenyonjo who won the league's goalscoring crown. Umony was also instrumental in his club in reaching the second round of the 2009 CAF Champions League scoring four goals, including strikes that helped eliminate Ferroviário Maputo and Supersport United. He also had a 16-match goal scoring run for club and country.

2009-12
After undergoing a week-long trial, Umony signed a two-year deal with South African Premier Soccer League club Supersport United in late June 2009. On 8 July 2010, he was released by SuperSport United.

On 31 August 2010, Umony moved to University of Pretoria F.C. on a permanent transfer. He signed a one-year deal with TUKS that will run in collaboration with the year that he had remaining on his SuperSport contract.

In February 2011, having trained with the club through its pre-season, Umony signed a one-year loan deal with the Portland Timbers for their debut year in Major League Soccer.

Following the 2011 season, the Timbers announced that they had declined the option to purchase Umony's rights and that he would not return for the 2012 season.

In January 2012, Umony signed with Vietnamese side Becamex Binh Duong.

In December 2012, Umony signed a two-year contract with Tanzanian club Azam F.C.

In April 2018, Umony moved to India and signed with I-League side Gokulam Kerala FC on a one-year deal.

In January 2019, Umony signed to play for Express FC. Umony is eyeing a place in Uganda Cranes' coach Sebastien Desabre's squad for the AFCON finals in mid 2019 where the Cranes will take part.

International career
Umony made his debut for the Uganda national football team in 2009. He topscored at the 2008 CECAFA Cup with five goals that helped his country win a record 10th CECAFA Cup title.

International goals
Scores and results list Uganda's goal tally first.

Personal life
Umony graduated from the Kyambogo University. He enjoys reading works of Shakespeare.

Playing honours

Kampala City Council
Ugandan Super League: 2007–08

National team
CECAFA Cup: 2009

Individual honours
 Ugandan Super League Golden Boot: 2007–08 (joint)
 Ugandan Footballer of the Year: 2008
 CECAFA Cup Golden Boot: 2009

References

External links

1986 births
Living people
Ugandan footballers
Association football forwards
Ugandan expatriates in South Africa
Uganda international footballers
SuperSport United F.C. players
Kampala Capital City Authority FC players
University of Pretoria F.C. players
Portland Timbers players
Expatriate soccer players in South Africa
Expatriate soccer players in the United States
Expatriate footballers in Tanzania
Major League Soccer players
Azam F.C. players
Gokulam Kerala FC players
I-League players
Expatriate footballers in India
People from Jinja District